KEEH (104.9 MHz) is a non-profit FM radio station in Spokane, Washington, known as "Shine 104.9."  It broadcasts a Contemporary Christian radio format and is owned by the Upper Columbia Media Association, with its offices and radio studios on South Grove Road.

KEEH has an effective radiated power (ERP) of 10,500 watts.  KEEH broadcasts using HD Radio technology.  Its digital subchannel, KEEH-HD2, carries a Christian talk and teaching service known as "Life Talk."  KEEH's Christian Contemporary format is also heard on FM translator K235CP at 94.9 MHz in Coeur d'Alene, Idaho, and also a full power station in Sandpoint, ID at 91.7.

History
KEEH began broadcasting in July 1991 as KAAR at 95.3 FM. In 1993 the station moved to 104.7 MHz as KEEH with 320 watts, as Positive Life Radio, and moved to its current frequency in 2004, along with a significant power upgrade. More recently, a translator signal was added at 94.9 FM which broadcasts to North Idaho, as well as a full power station in Sandpoint, ID at 91.7.

External links
 Shine 104.9's website

EEH
EEH
EEH
Radio stations established in 1991
1991 establishments in Washington (state)